Doug Thomson (14 December 1896 – 2 February 1959) was an  Australian rules footballer who played with St Kilda in the Victorian Football League (VFL).

Notes

External links 

1896 births
1959 deaths
Australian rules footballers from Victoria (Australia)
St Kilda Football Club players